The following is a list of events affecting 2017 in Indian television.

Television series debuts
Aisi Deewangi Dekhi Nahi Kahi
Sethji (TV series)
Sthreepadham
Tu Aashiqui
Vanambadi (TV series)

Television series endings
 Agar Tum Saath Ho
 Ammuvinte Amma
 Ardhangini (2017 TV series)

Television seasons
 Dance Champions
Partners Trouble Ho Gayi Double
Pushpavalli (TV series)
 Har Mard Ka Dard

References

 
2017 in India
Entertainment in India
Indian culture